A krypton fluoride laser (KrF laser) is a particular type of excimer laser, which is sometimes (more correctly) called an exciplex laser. With its 248 nanometer wavelength, it is a deep ultraviolet laser which is commonly used in the production of semiconductor integrated circuits, industrial micromachining, and scientific research. The term excimer is short for 'excited dimer', while exciplex is short for 'excited complex'. An excimer laser typically contains a mixture of: a noble gas  such as argon, krypton, or xenon; and a halogen gas such as fluorine or chlorine.  Under suitably intense conditions of electromagnetic stimulation and pressure, the mixture emits a beam of coherent stimulated radiation as laser light in the ultraviolet range.

KrF and ArF excimer lasers are widely incorporated into high-resolution photolithography machines, one of the critical tools required for microelectronic chip manufacturing in nanometer dimensions. Excimer laser lithography has enabled transistor feature sizes to shrink from 800 nanometers in 1990 to 10 nanometers in 2016.

Theory
A krypton fluoride laser absorbs energy from a source, causing the krypton gas to react with the fluorine gas producing the exciplex krypton fluoride, a temporary complex in an excited energy state:

2 Kr +  → 2 KrF

The complex can undergo spontaneous or stimulated emission, reducing its energy state to a metastable, but highly repulsive ground state. The ground state complex quickly dissociates into unbound atoms:

2 KrF → 2 Kr + 

The result is an exciplex laser which radiates energy at 248 nm, near the ultraviolet portion of the spectrum, corresponding with the energy difference between the ground state and the excited state of the complex.

Example Systems
There have been several of these lasers built for ICF experiments; examples include: 
 Los Alamos built a KrF laser in 1985 to prove test firing of beam with an energy level of 1.0 × 104 joules.  This was part of the larger Aurora laser research effort that looked a CO2 lasers and other systems. 
 Nike Laser.  The Laser Plasma Branch of the Naval Research Laboratory completed a KrF laser called the Nike laser that can produce about 4.5 × 103 joules of UV energy output in a 4 nanosecond pulse.  The NIKE laser was switched to an Argon fluoride laser after 2013 to show the impact of going to shorter (193 nm) wavelengths. 
 Naval Research Laboratory built the Electra laser and Nike to prove out both KrF and ArF lasers for ICF approaches.  In 2013, Electra demonstrated 90,000 shots over 10 hours of operation.  
 Rutherford Appleton Laboratory built the Sprite and Titania KrF lasers
 Japan's Electrotechnical Laboratory built the Ashura and Super Ashura KrF lasers.
 China Institute for Atomic Energy had a laser before the middle-1990's
 Livermore National Laboratory developed a KrF laser and amplifier known as a Raman Amplifier Pumped by Intensified Excimer Radiation (RAPIER) system system.

Applications
This laser has also been used to produce soft X-ray emission from a plasma, through irradiation by brief pulses of this laser light. Other important applications include manipulating of various materials such as plastic, glass, crystal, composite materials and living tissue. The light from this UV laser is strongly absorbed by lipids, nucleic acids and proteins, making it useful for applications in medical therapy and surgery.

Microelectronics
The most widespread industrial application of KrF excimer lasers has been in deep-ultraviolet photolithography for the manufacturing of microelectronic devices (i.e., semiconductor integrated circuits or "chips"). From the early 1960s through the mid-1980s, Hg-Xe lamps had been used for lithography at 436, 405 and 365 nm wavelengths. However, with the semiconductor industry's need for both finer resolution (for denser and faster chips) and higher production throughput (for lower costs), the lamp-based lithography tools were no longer able to meet the industry's requirements. This challenge was overcome when in a pioneering development in 1982, deep-UV excimer laser lithography was demonstrated at IBM by K. Jain. With phenomenal advances made in equipment and technology in the last two decades, modern semiconductor electronic devices fabricated using excimer laser lithography now total more than $400 billion in annual production. As a result, it is the semiconductor industry view that excimer laser lithography (with both KrF and ArF lasers) has been a crucial factor in the predictive power of Moore's law. From an even broader scientific and technological perspective: since the invention of the laser in 1960, the development of excimer laser lithography has been highlighted as one of the major milestones in the 50-year history of the laser.

Fusion Research
The KrF laser has been used in nuclear fusion energy research since the 1980s. This laser offers several advantages:
 High rate repetition shots - because the KrF is made using gas it does not heat up, allowing for higher shot rates.  
 Higher beam uniformity
 Relatively shorter wavelength for improved ICF compression.

Safety
The light emitted by the KrF is invisible to the human eye, so additional safety precautions are necessary when working with this laser to avoid stray beams. Gloves are needed to protect the skin from the potentially carcinogenic properties of the UV beam, and UV goggles are needed to protect the eyes.

See also
Argon fluoride laser
Nike laser
Laser
Krypton difluoride
Krypton
Fluorine
Excimer laser
Excimer lamp
Photolithography
Excimer

References

External links
Laser fusion energy
Nike KrF Laser Facility
Nikon KrF

Excimer lasers
Krypton
Fluorine